Concierto de almas may refer to:
 Concierto de almas (TV series), a 1969 Mexican telenovela
 Concierto de almas (film), a 1942 Argentine film